Planet Scum Live was an American comedy network founded by Chris Gethard and broadcast live on the Twitch streaming service. It was also the name of the weekly show that Gethard has hosted on the network starting May 3, 2020.

Initially, after the COVID-19 pandemic closed down production on Gethards MNN public access show Chris Gethard Presents, the Planet Scum Live network was built around the weekly live Wednesday show, but since its launch, the network of comedians Gethard had been working with at MNN have added their own separate shows to the live platform, and it now hosts a wide variety of programming six days a week, each show created and hosted by a different comedian.

Current Programming

References

American comedy